Rayamajhi is a Rajput-Chhetri family name. Rayamajhis belong to Ekthariya Chhetri subcaste that is widely accepted to be of patrilineal Rajput origin from present day India.

Notable people with the surname Rayamajhi
Deepak Rayamajhi, Nepali Film Director
Dilip Rayamajhi, Nepali Film Actor
Top Bahadur Rayamajhi, Deputy Prime Minister
Narayan Rayamajhi, Nepali composer, lyricist, feature-film script writer, film director, and producer.
Keshar Jung Rayamajhi, Advisor to late King Birendra Bir Bikram Shah

Notes

References

External links
Subodh Rana's blog 
Subodh Rana writes how Colonel Gambir Singh Rayamajhi single-handedly captured an enemy cannon

Surnames of Nepalese origin
Khas surnames